"Keep On, Keepin' On" is a song by American rapper MC Lyte featuring American girl group Xscape. It was produced and co-written by Jermaine Dupri and samples Michael Jackson's 1989 single "Liberian Girl". It was featured on the soundtrack to Sunset Park, starring Rhea Perlman, and later appeared also on MC Lyte's fifth studio album, Bad As I Wanna B (1996). The song became her highest charting single in the US, peaking at No. 10 on the Billboard Hot 100, and it also became her second single to achieve a gold certification from the RIAA, earning the award on May 31, 1996. In November of the same year, MC Lyte performed the song when she appeared in the second season of the UPN sitcom Moesha also with Xscape themselves.

Critical reception
Larry Flick from Billboard felt that the soundtrack to Sunset Park "gets an excellent introduction with this ticking jeep cruiser that is fueled by Lyte's reliably sharp, smart, rhymes, Xscape's shimmering harmonizing, and deft use of a sample from Michael Jackson's "Liberian Girl". Jermaine Dupri produced the cut with a spare, diamond-hard heat and delicate Caribbean keyboard flavors. Will likely begin a healthy commercial ruin with hip-hop enthusiasts before making a much deserved transition into the mainstream pop arena." Alan Jones from Music Week noted that "Keep On, Keepin' On" "has been cleaned up for radio and is a splendid rap, further decorated by Xscape's soulful interjections. Based on a looped portion of Michael Jackson's Liberian Girl, it's a strong contender." A reviewer from People Magazine said it is "so ridiculously snappy that you half expect the 26-year-old rapper to finally drop her guard and burst into song."

Single track listing
A1: "Keep On, Keepin' On" - 4:33
A2: "Keep On, Keepin' On" (Clean Version) - 4:33
B1" "Keep On, Keepin' On" - 4:33
B2: "Keep On, Keepin' On" (Instrumental) - 4:33
B3: "Keep On, Keepin' On" (Acappella) - 4:31

Charts and certifications

Weekly charts

Year-end charts

Certifications

References

MC Lyte songs
1996 singles
Song recordings produced by Jermaine Dupri
Songs written by Michael Jackson
Songs written by Jermaine Dupri
1996 songs
Elektra Records singles
Songs written by MC Lyte